Mateaki Fonnama'atonga Mafi, also known by the nickname of "Matti", is a Tongan dual-code international rugby union and rugby league footballer, and sprinter. He played representative rugby union (RU) for rugby league and representative rugby league (RL) for Tonga, most notably at the 1995 Rugby League World Cup, and participated at the 1992 Summer Olympics as a 200m sprinter.

Athletic career
Mafi was a 200m sprinter and as a 19-year-old represented Tonga at the 1992 Summer Olympics in Barcelona. He finished fifth in his heat and failed to make the quarterfinals.

Rugby union career
Mafi was a rugby union player in the Tongan domestic competition.

Rugby league career
Mafi switched to rugby league in 1995, joining the Warrington Wolves in England. He was named in the Tongan squad for the 1995 World Cup. Along with Willie Swann and Martin Dermott, Mafi was sacked by Warrington early in the 1997 season after the club had a poor start to the season.

Return to rugby union
Mafi then returned to rugby union, joining Dunvant RFC in Wales. In 2000 he moved to the Bridgend RFC, before finishing his career with the Taibach RFC. He retired in 2004.

During his time in rugby union he represented Tonga at rugby sevens and also played for the Barbarians FC.

Later years
Mafi now works as a security officer at the St Davids Dewi Sant Shopping Centre in Cardiff. He also shows his Neapolitan Mastiffs at dog shows, winning two awards at the 2008 Crufts.

Achievements in athletics

References

External links
 

Living people
Tongan rugby league players
Tonga national rugby league team players
Warrington Wolves players
1972 births
Olympic athletes of Tonga
Tongan rugby union players
Tongan male sprinters
Athletes (track and field) at the 1992 Summer Olympics
Bridgend RFC players
Security guards
Tongan expatriate rugby union players
Expatriate rugby union players in Wales
Tongan expatriate sportspeople in Wales
Rugby league wingers
Footballers who switched code